Thealka is an unincorporated community in Johnson County, Kentucky, United States. It was created by the North East Coal Company in 1906.and was originally called Muddy Branch. In 1911, it was renamed "Thealka" after the steamboat known by the same name. Both the community and the steamboat were named after John C.C. Mayo's wife, Alice Jane Mayo, who was given the nickname "Alka". Thealka is in the 41240 ZIP Code Tabulation Area, which includes the nearby city of Paintsville.

Geography

Education

Most students residing in Thealka attend:
W.R. Castle Elementary School in Wittensville (kindergarten-sixth grade)
Johnson County Middle School in Paintsville (seventh-eighth grade)
Johnson Central High School in Paintsville (ninth-twelfth grade)

Attractions
Thealka boasts Johnson County Park and Recreational Area, more commonly known as Thealka Park. The park features a playground, an outdoor basketball court, an outdoor volleyball court, walking trails, two baseball fields, and two picnic shelters.

References

Unincorporated communities in Johnson County, Kentucky
Unincorporated communities in Kentucky
Company towns in Kentucky
Populated places established in 1906
Coal towns in Kentucky
1906 establishments in Kentucky